Adolf "Adi" Tuma (born 27 June 1956) is an Austrian painter and lithographer. His activities comprise decorative architecture, paintings, stamps and cancellations. Tuma's primary subject is nature.

He is best known for his designs used for stamps by various postal administrations. In this context he has received a Silver Decoration to the Republic of Austria. Presently his works on stamps only contains more than 100 pieces.

Artistic style and themes 
His free designs reflect his respect and love for nature in its widest sense. He is influenced by Friedensreich Hundertwasser

Honors 
Yehudi Menuhin Trophy 2006 for Music Philately

List of stamps (extract)

for Austria 
 1999 Europe 1999
 2004 Cardinal Franz König
 2004 Catholics' Day
 2005 The Mauthausen Concentration Camp
 2005 50 years reopening of the (Austrian) National Theatre and State Opera House
 2006 China-Austria joint issue: “Guqin”
 2006 China-Austria joint issue: “Piano”

for Liechtenstein 
 2003 White Storks in the Alpine River Valley

for Luxembourg 
 2000 Historic patrimony: Vauban Circular Walk

External links 
Austria Post honor Mauthausen prisoners (stampnews.com)
Kosellexikon: Adolf Tuma 
Österreichische Post AG würdigt Kardinal Franz König

References 

Austrian lithographers
Living people
Austrian stamp designers
1956 births